The 1963 Georgia Bulldogs football team represented the Georgia Bulldogs of the University of Georgia during the 1963 NCAA University Division football season. The Bulldogs posted a 4–5–1 record.

Schedule

References

Georgia
Georgia Bulldogs football seasons
Georgia Bulldogs football